Kristen Dowling (born July 24, 1984) is an American basketball coach who is currently the head women's basketball coach at Pepperdine University. She was previously the head women's basketball coach of the Claremont-Mudd-Scripps Athenas, a program involving students from Claremont McKenna College, Harvey Mudd College, and Scripps College in Claremont, California.

Coaching career 
After one season as the head coach of the freshman team at her alma mater Upland High School, Dowling was a graduate assistant and academic advisor at Pepperdine for two seasons. She returned to Pepperdine in 2010 as an assistant coach after two seasons as an assistant at Cal State Bakersfield before leaving to be the head coach at Division III program Claremont-Mudd-Scripps. At Claremont-Mudd-Scripps, she rebounded from a 9–16 record in her first season to winning six consecutive Southern California Intercollegiate Athletic Conference (SCIAC) regular season titles and a SCIAC Coach of the Year award in 2015.

Dowling was named the head coach at Pepperdine in 2019, marking her third stint with the program.

Head coaching record

Career statistics

Source:

References

External links 
 
 Pepperdine Waves profile
 USA Basketball profile

1984 births
Living people
People from Upland, California
Basketball players from California
Basketball coaches from California
Redlands Bulldogs women's basketball players
High school basketball coaches in California
Pepperdine Waves women's basketball coaches
Cal State Bakersfield Roadrunners women's basketball coaches
Claremont-Mudd-Scripps Athenas basketball coaches